"Star Wars (Main Title)" is a musical theme composed and conducted by John Williams. The 1977 London Symphony Orchestra recording peaked at number ten on Billboard Hot 100 and number thirteen in Canada RPM Top Singles. Meco's disco version of "Star Wars Theme/Cantina Band" was a global hit in the same year.

History
It is the main musical theme of Star Wars and is also considered the primary leitmotif for Luke Skywalker, the protagonist of the original Star Wars trilogy. The original 1977 recording was performed by the London Symphony Orchestra. The track became a hit in the United States (#10) and Canada (#13) during the fall of that year. The composition draws influence from Erich Wolfgang Korngold's score for the 1942 film Kings Row and Gustav Holst's Jupiter from his orchestral suite, The Planets.

The B side featured the original movie score of Cantina Band.

"Star Wars (Main Title)" was the lesser of two hits featuring music from Star Wars.  Meco's disco version of "Star Wars Theme/Cantina Band" reached number one concurrently with the chart run of Williams' original movie score version.

Charts

Weekly charts

Year-end charts

Patrick Gleeson cover
The Star Wars main title theme was covered by Patrick Gleeson a month after the release of the London Symphony Orchestra performance. His version was released in France and the United States.

References

External links
 
 

Film theme songs
1977 singles
1977 compositions
20th Century Fox Records singles
Compositions by John Williams
Compositions for symphony orchestra
Compositions in B-flat major
Concert band pieces
Main Title
1970s instrumentals
Star Wars (film)
Songs about outer space